Collier Glacier is in the U.S. state of Oregon. The glacier is situated in the Cascade Range at an elevation generally above . Collier Glacier is on the west slopes of North Sister, an extinct shield volcano. Since its last maximum extent during the Little Ice Age (1350–1850 A.D.) the glacier has retreated over a mile.

See also
 List of glaciers in the United States

External links
Information about Collier Glacier on glaciers.us

References

Glaciers of Oregon
Glaciers of Lane County, Oregon